Azbukum is a centre for Serbian language and culture founded in 1995. It offers various courses and programs aimed at promoting the language and culture of the Serbs, such as courses in Serbian, Ethno Camps, and Caravans through Serbia. It operates in Belgrade and Novi Sad, Serbia.

It also offers the Serbian Language Online Program, an Internet-based course for those who wish to study Serbian.

The founder and director of Azbukum is Nataša Milićević-Dobromirov.

External links
 Azbukum website
 Southeast Europe Online: Azbukum
 University of Alberta: Serbian Cultural Club
 Arizona State University: Critical Languages Institute

Serbian culture
Culture of Vojvodina
Education in Belgrade
Education in Novi Sad
Educational institutions established in 1995
1995 establishments in Serbia